Rushbury is a civil parish in Shropshire, England.  It contains 26 listed buildings that are recorded in the National Heritage List for England.  Of these, one is listed at Grade I, the highest of the three grades, one is at Grade II*, the middle grade, and the others are at Grade II, the lowest grade.  The parish is almost entirely rural and contains only small scattered settlements.  In the parish are a former manor house and a country house, both of which are listed together with associated structures.  Most of the other listed buildings are houses, farmhouses and farm buildings, the earliest of which are timber framed or have a timber-framed core.  The remainder of the listed buildings consist of a church, memorials in the churchyard, a packhorse bridge, a road bridge, a school, and a telephone kiosk.


Key

Buildings

References

Citations

Sources

Lists of buildings and structures in Shropshire